is a Japanese motorcycle racer. He was the All Japan GP-Mono champion in 2011.

Career statistics

FIM CEV Moto2 European Championship

Races by year
(key) (Races in bold indicate pole position, races in italics indicate fastest lap)

Grand Prix motorcycle racing

By season

By class

Races by year
(key) (Races in bold indicate pole position, races in italics indicate fastest lap)

Superbike World Championship

Races by year

(key) (Races in bold indicate pole position) (Races in italics indicate fastest lap)

References

External links

1992 births
Living people
Japanese motorcycle racers
Moto2 World Championship riders
Sportspeople from Kanagawa Prefecture
MotoGP World Championship riders
LCR Team MotoGP riders
Superbike World Championship riders